Anne Feldhaus (Phelḍahāusa, Âna; born 1949) is Distinguished Foundation Professor of Religious Studies, Emeritus Professor,  at Arizona State University.  Her field of specialty is Maharashtra, India, combining philological and ethnographic approaches to study religious traditions of Maharashtra, the Marathi-language region of western India.

Honors and awards 
Among her awards and honors are Fulbright-Hays Research Award (1993–1994)(1987–1989); Social Science Research Council Research Award (1995); John Simon Guggenheim Fellowship (2002–2003);  National Endowment for the Humanities, Fellowship for Independent Research (2007–2008).

She was president of the Association for Asian Studies 2018- 2019. and in 2020 was elected to the American Academy of Arts & Sciences

Academic career
She first went to India as an undergraduate in 1970, lived with a Brahman family, and later recalled that her "knowledge of Indian culture was confined to translations of the Bhagavad Gita (which I found immoral) and some Upanishads (which I found incomprehensible)." She also recalled, however, that her "Roman Catholic childhood and Sacred Heart education had prepared me quite well to appreciate an all-encompassing ritualization of life." 

After graduating from Manhattanville College in 1971, she earned her Doctor's degree in Religious Thought at University of Pennsylvania in 1976. She joined the faculty of Arizona State University in 1981, and became full professor there in 1988.

Selected publications

References

External links 
 Anne Feldhaus Profile experts.asu
Feldhaus, Anne WorldCat Authority page.

1949 births
Arizona State University faculty
Manhattanville College alumni
University of Pennsylvania alumni
American Indologists
American historians of religion
Presidents of the Association for Asian Studies
Living people